The Sui–Former Lý War was a military conflict between the Chinese Sui dynasty and the Vietnamese Former Lý dynasty in 602, eventually resulting in the collapse of the latter.

In 601, Lý Phật Tử, ruler of the Former Lý dynasty was summoned to attend the Chinese court. However, he delayed the attendance and eventually rebelled in 602, even though he had recognized Sui authority in 595. He concentrated his military forces at the Vạn Xuân capital Co Loa and at Long Bien. In 602, General Liu Fang led his army in the invasion of Vạn Xuân.

The Sui army departed via Yunnan to the Former Lý territory. However, the Vietnamese army was unprepared to fend them off because they had not expected that the Sui army would take this invasion route. In the end, Lý Phật Tử surrendered to the Sui forces in front of his palace in Long Biên. Consequently, the Chinese took him captive and transferred him to the Chinese capital Chang'an, although he died on the way. Liu Fang's army also forced the submission or defeated the remaining local clans. The conquered territory was re-incorporated into China.

See also
 Sui–Lâm Ấp war

References

Bibliography

602
600s conflicts
Invasions
Military campaigns involving China
Military campaigns involving Vietnam
Wars involving Imperial China
Wars involving Vietnam
7th century in Vietnam
7th century in China
Wars between China and Vietnam